Carina Ricco (born November 27, 1968, Veracruz, Mexico) is a Mexican actress, singer, musician, producer and composer. In 2007 she opened her own music record company. She is the widow of Eduardo Palomo, father of her two kids, Fiona and Luca.

Biography
Born in the port city of Veracruz, Mexico of Spanish and Italian origin, Carina spent her childhood in Argentina, where she began exploring the world of music as a very young child. She started her professional musical career, in earnest, once back in Mexico as a teenager.

In 1993 she released her first solo album, Del Cabello a los Pies (Head to Toe), and toured Central and South America. She is most proud of her performances at the “Viña del Mar Festival”, where she was her country’s representative.

In 1997 she released Sueños Urbanos (Urban Dreams), the album in which we discover more about Carina as songwriter with themes composed by her. Her single Solo Quiero reached the pinnacle of popularity.

Despite interest from major record labels Carina chose to start her own record company. In 2007 Damselfly Records gives birth to Viaje Personal.

Carina is a singer, musician and composer with versatile talent who has also explored film, theatre and television, both as an actress and as a producer.

External links
 http://www.carinaricco.com

1969 births
Living people
Mexican women singers
Mexican musicians
Mexican people of Italian descent
Mexican people of Spanish descent
Actresses from Veracruz
Singers from Veracruz